Bellman is a surname. A variant of the surname is Belman. Notable people with the surname include:

Carl Michael Bellman (1740-1795), Swedish poet and composer
Dmitriy Bellman (born 1977), Russian artist jeweller

Gina Bellman (born 1966), New Zealand/English actress
Heiko Bellmann (1950-2014) German biologist, writer, zoologist and photographer
Jonathan Bellman (born 1957), American musicologist
Lois Bellman (1926-2015), All-American Girls Professional Baseball League player
Richard E. Bellman (1920-1984), American mathematician
Samuel H. Bellman (1906-1999), American lawyer and politician
Veronika Bellmann (born 1960), German politician

Fictional characters:
Beatrice Bellman, a character played by Maureen Lipman in BT commercials